Vitamin P may refer to:

 Flavonoids, referred to as Vitamin P from the mid-1930s to early 1950s
 Fluoxetine (Prozac), euphemistically referred to as Vitamin P, an SSRI used for depression and various mental disorders
 Paroxetine (Paxil), euphemistically referred to as Vitamin P, an SSRI used for depression and anxiety disorders
 Prolintane, an NDRI stimulant